The Bulgaria national baseball team is the national baseball team of Bulgaria. The team represents Bulgaria in international competitions. Their best performance is reaching the quarter final stage in the 2006 European Championships while getting third place at the 2009 Junior European Championships.

Another success of the Bulgaria national baseball team is that the team is a five-time Balkan champion.

Roster
Bulgaria's roster for the European Baseball Championship Qualifier 2022, the last official competition in which the team took part.

Tournament results
European Baseball Championship

European Junior Baseball Championships

References

External links
 Bulgaria baseball official site

National baseball teams in Europe
Baseball